The 1980 Memphis State Tigers football team represented Memphis State University (now known as the University of Memphis) as an independent during the 1980 NCAA Division I-A football season. In its sixth and final season under head coach Richard Williamson, the team compiled a 2–9 record and was outscored by a total of 255 to 115. The team played its home games at Liberty Bowl Memorial Stadium in Memphis, Tennessee. 

The team's statistical leaders included Darrell Martin with 888 passing yards, Richard Williams with 438 rushing yards, Jerry Knowlton with 470 receiving yards, and Rusty Bennett with 35 points scored.

Schedule

References

Memphis State
Memphis Tigers football seasons
Memphis State Tigers football